Sandra dos Santos (born 2 June 1992) is a Portuguese professional racing cyclist, who last rode for the UCI Women's Team  during the 2019 women's road cycling season.

References

External links

1992 births
Living people
Portuguese female cyclists
Place of birth missing (living people)